·Freeman Township may refer to the following places in the United States:

 Freeman Township, Pope County, Arkansas
 Freeman Township, Woodruff County, Arkansas, Woodruff County, Arkansas
 Freeman Township, Clay County, Iowa
 Freeman Township, Michigan
 Freeman Township, Freeborn County, Minnesota
 Freeman Township, Richland County, North Dakota, Richland County, North Dakota

Township name disambiguation pages